Ovčjak is a remote abandoned settlement in the Municipality of Črnomelj in the White Carniola area of southeastern Slovenia. The area is part of the traditional region of Lower Carniola and is now included in the Southeast Slovenia Statistical Region. Its territory is now part of the village of Rožič Vrh.

History
Ovčjak was a Gottschee German village that was settled in the 17th century. Before the Second World War it had 10 houses. The area was burned by Italian troops during the Rog Offensive in the summer of 1942. The former village is registered as a cultural heritage site.

Notable people
Notable people that were born or lived in Ovčjak include:
 Michael Ruppe (1863–1951), sculptor and painter

References

External links
Ovčjak on Geopedia
Pre–World War II map of Ovčjak with oeconyms and family names

Former populated places in the Municipality of Črnomelj